D-glycero-alpha-D-manno-heptose-7-phosphate kinase (D-alpha-D-heptose-7-phosphate kinase, hdda (gene)) is an enzyme with systematic name ATP:D-glycero-alpha-D-manno-heptose 7-phosphate 1-phosphotransferase. This enzyme catalyses the following chemical reaction

 D-glycero-alpha-D-manno-heptose 7-phosphate + ATP  D-glycero-alpha-D-manno-heptose 1,7-bisphosphate + ADP

The enzyme participates in biosynthesis of GDP-D-glycero-alpha-D-manno-heptose.

References

External links 
 

EC 2.7.1